Capcom Arcade Cabinet is a compilation of seventeen Capcom 1980s arcade games for the PlayStation 3 and Xbox 360. The compilation was released in five separate packs of three games during February–May 2013. A purchase of all five packs included two additional games free. The full compilation pack was released in April 2013. An arcade machine was made to promote the Capcom Arcade Cabinet series at the Gadget Show Live 2013 in Birmingham, UK.

Games
The first pack includes Black Tiger, 1943: The Battle of Midway, and Avengers. The second pack includes Ghosts 'n Goblins, Gun.Smoke, and Section Z. The third pack includes Side Arms, The Speed Rumbler, and Exed Exes. The fourth pack includes Commando, Legendary Wings, and Trojan. The final pack includes 1942, SonSon, Pirate Ship Higemaru. The bonus games are 1943 Kai and Vulgus, unlocked if the fifteen main games were purchased.

Reception

Capcom Arcade Cabinet received "mixed or average" reviews from critics according to review aggregator Metacritic. Comic Book Resources lamented this compilation having started Capcom into following Nintendo's trend of emulation "retreads", saying this: "Beyond the price, the collection's lack of big name titles and a general lack of excitement over another retro game collection put it in the middle of the pack. ... The downside is that these companies have normalized the practice of re-selling consumers classic games every console generation, and that's a price gamers shouldn't have to pay."

References

External links
 Official site 

2013 video games
Capcom video game compilations
PlayStation 3 games
Video games developed in Japan
Xbox 360 games